Alexandros Aresti (born 11 March 1983) is a Cypriot former swimmer, who specialized in freestyle events. He is a two-time Olympian (2000 and 2004), and  a Cypriot record holder in the 100 and 200 m freestyle.

Aresti made his official debut, as a 17-year-old, at the 2000 Summer Olympics in Sydney, where he competed in the men's 200 m freestyle. Swimming in heat two, he rounded out the field of seven swimmers to last place and forty-ninth overall by a 5.32-second margin behind winner Mark Chay of Singapore in 1:57.54.

At the 2004 Summer Olympics in Athens, Aresti extended his program by qualifying for two swimming events. He cleared FINA B-standard entry times of 51.45 (100 m freestyle) and 1:53.61 (200 m freestyle) from the Akropolis Grand Prix. In the 200 m freestyle, Aresti challenged seven other swimmers on the third heat, including Olympic veteran Aleksandar Malenko of Yugoslavia. He edged out Chinese Taipei's Chen Te-tung to take a sixth spot and forty-fourth overall by 0.24 of a second in 1:53.90. In his second event, 100 m freestyle, Aresti placed thirty-eighth on the morning's preliminaries. Swimming in heat four, Aresti blasted a Cypriot record of 51.10 to save a second spot over Papua New Guinea's Ryan Pini by 0.01 of a second.

References

External links 
 
 

1983 births
Living people
Cypriot male freestyle swimmers
Olympic swimmers of Cyprus
Swimmers at the 2000 Summer Olympics
Swimmers at the 2004 Summer Olympics
People from Larnaca
Commonwealth Games competitors for Cyprus
Swimmers at the 2002 Commonwealth Games
20th-century Cypriot people
21st-century Cypriot people